The Chelyabinsk constituency (No.189) is a Russian legislative constituency in Chelyabinsk Oblast. Until 2007 the constituency covered urban Chelyabinsk, however, after 2015 redistricting it was stretched to central Chelyabinsk Oblast.

Members elected

Election results

1993

|-
! colspan=2 style="background-color:#E9E9E9;text-align:left;vertical-align:top;" |Candidate
! style="background-color:#E9E9E9;text-align:left;vertical-align:top;" |Party
! style="background-color:#E9E9E9;text-align:right;" |Votes
! style="background-color:#E9E9E9;text-align:right;" |%
|-
|style="background-color:#0085BE"|
|align=left|Vladimir Golovlyov
|align=left|Choice of Russia
|
|22.03%
|-
|style="background-color:"|
|align=left|Lyubov Lymar
|align=left|Kedr
| -
|16.70%
|-
| colspan="5" style="background-color:#E9E9E9;"|
|- style="font-weight:bold"
| colspan="3" style="text-align:left;" | Total
| 
| 100%
|-
| colspan="5" style="background-color:#E9E9E9;"|
|- style="font-weight:bold"
| colspan="4" |Source:
|
|}

1995

|-
! colspan=2 style="background-color:#E9E9E9;text-align:left;vertical-align:top;" |Candidate
! style="background-color:#E9E9E9;text-align:left;vertical-align:top;" |Party
! style="background-color:#E9E9E9;text-align:right;" |Votes
! style="background-color:#E9E9E9;text-align:right;" |%
|-
|style="background-color:#3A46CE"|
|align=left|Vladimir Golovlyov (incumbent)
|align=left|Democratic Choice of Russia – United Democrats
|
|21.81%
|-
|style="background-color:"|
|align=left|Raisa Podvigina
|align=left|Democratic Russia and Free Trade Unions
|
|9.39%
|-
|style="background-color:"|
|align=left|German Vyatkin
|align=left|Our Home – Russia
|
|9.21%
|-
|style="background-color:"|
|align=left|Vladimir Vorushilin
|align=left|Yabloko
|
|6.88%
|-
|style="background-color:"|
|align=left|Nikolay Chepasov
|align=left|Communist Party
|
|6.26%
|-
|style="background-color:"|
|align=left|Mikhail Boldyrev
|align=left|Independent
|
|4.35%
|-
|style="background-color:#D50000"|
|align=left|Aleksandr Petrov
|align=left|Communists and Working Russia - for the Soviet Union
|
|4.07%
|-
|style="background-color:#DA2021"|
|align=left|Mikhail Isayev
|align=left|Ivan Rybkin Bloc
|
|3.74%
|-
|style="background-color:"|
|align=left|Yury Lengin
|align=left|Independent
|
|3.31%
|-
|style="background-color:"|
|align=left|Vladimir Malakhov
|align=left|Independent
|
|3.29%
|-
|style="background-color:#2C299A"|
|align=left|Valery Sudarikov
|align=left|Congress of Russian Communities
|
|2.75%
|-
|style="background-color:"|
|align=left|Mikhail Kotelnikov
|align=left|Liberal Democratic Party
|
|2.71%
|-
|style="background-color:"|
|align=left|Anatoly Zhezhera
|align=left|Independent
|
|2.68%
|-
|style="background-color:#EE2D2A"|
|align=left|Vladimir Gornov
|align=left|Bloc of Djuna
|
|1.89%
|-
|style="background-color:#F5821F"|
|align=left|Vladimir Dragunov
|align=left|Bloc of Independents
|
|1.40%
|-
|style="background-color:"|
|align=left|Vladislav Sirota
|align=left|Independent
|
|1.39%
|-
|style="background-color:"|
|align=left|Oleg Gulyak
|align=left|Independent
|
|1.30%
|-
|style="background-color:"|
|align=left|Nikolay Kuznetsov
|align=left|Independent
|
|1.08%
|-
|style="background-color:"|
|align=left|Viktor Radionov
|align=left|Russian Party
|
|0.61%
|-
|style="background-color:"|
|align=left|Gennady Suzdalev
|align=left|Zemsky Sobor
|
|0.36%
|-
|style="background-color:#000000"|
|colspan=2 |against all
|
|8.40%
|-
| colspan="5" style="background-color:#E9E9E9;"|
|- style="font-weight:bold"
| colspan="3" style="text-align:left;" | Total
| 
| 100%
|-
| colspan="5" style="background-color:#E9E9E9;"|
|- style="font-weight:bold"
| colspan="4" |Source:
|
|}

1999

|-
! colspan=2 style="background-color:#E9E9E9;text-align:left;vertical-align:top;" |Candidate
! style="background-color:#E9E9E9;text-align:left;vertical-align:top;" |Party
! style="background-color:#E9E9E9;text-align:right;" |Votes
! style="background-color:#E9E9E9;text-align:right;" |%
|-
|style="background-color:"|
|align=left|Mikhail Yurevich
|align=left|Independent
|
|45.25%
|-
|style="background-color:"|
|align=left|Viktor Chernobrovin
|align=left|Independent
|
|25.86%
|-
|style="background-color:"|
|align=left|Yekaterina Gorina
|align=left|Independent
|
|3.34%
|-
|style="background-color:"|
|align=left|Yury Lengin
|align=left|Independent
|
|2.48%
|-
|style="background-color:#1042A5"|
|align=left|Svetlana Mironova
|align=left|Union of Right Forces
|
|2.32%
|-
|style="background-color:#FF4400"|
|align=left|Viktor Deryugin
|align=left|Andrey Nikolayev and Svyatoslav Fyodorov Bloc
|
|2.29%
|-
|style="background-color:"|
|align=left|Gennady Likhachev
|align=left|Independent
|
|1.85%
|-
|style="background-color:"|
|align=left|Lyubov Patrakova
|align=left|Congress of Russian Communities-Yury Boldyrev Movement
|
|1.82%
|-
|style="background-color:"|
|align=left|Vladimir Vasenin
|align=left|Independent
|
|0.88%
|-
|style="background-color:"|
|align=left|Boris Mitrofanov
|align=left|Independent
|
|0.66%
|-
|style="background-color:#000000"|
|colspan=2 |against all
|
|11.62%
|-
| colspan="5" style="background-color:#E9E9E9;"|
|- style="font-weight:bold"
| colspan="3" style="text-align:left;" | Total
| 
| 100%
|-
| colspan="5" style="background-color:#E9E9E9;"|
|- style="font-weight:bold"
| colspan="4" |Source:
|
|}

2003

|-
! colspan=2 style="background-color:#E9E9E9;text-align:left;vertical-align:top;" |Candidate
! style="background-color:#E9E9E9;text-align:left;vertical-align:top;" |Party
! style="background-color:#E9E9E9;text-align:right;" |Votes
! style="background-color:#E9E9E9;text-align:right;" |%
|-
|style="background-color:#FFD700"|
|align=left|Mikhail Yurevich (incumbent)
|align=left|People's Party
|
|33.13%
|-
|style="background-color:"|
|align=left|Aleksandr Berestov
|align=left|Rodina
|
|15.74%
|-
|style="background-color:"|
|align=left|Sergey Davydov
|align=left|Independent
|
|15.64%
|-
|style="background-color:"|
|align=left|Anatoly Ivanov
|align=left|Communist Party
|
|4.28%
|-
|style="background-color:"|
|align=left|Daniil Yurevich
|align=left|Independent
|
|3.50%
|-
|style="background-color:#C21022"|
|align=left|Nina Bobirenko
|align=left|Russian Pensioners' Party-Party of Social Justice
|
|3.13%
|-
|style="background-color:"|
|align=left|Vladimir Filichkin
|align=left|Independent
|
|2.88%
|-
|style="background-color:"|
|align=left|Ilya Subbotin
|align=left|Yabloko
|
|2.04%
|-
|style="background-color:"|
|align=left|Lyubov Patrakova
|align=left|Independent
|
|1.72%
|-
|style="background-color:"|
|align=left|Vladimir Gruzdev
|align=left|Liberal Democratic Party
|
|1.00%
|-
|style="background-color:#408080"|
|align=left|Sergey Kostromin
|align=left|For a Holy Russia
|
|0.40%
|-
|style="background-color:#164C8C"|
|align=left|Vladimir Berko
|align=left|United Russian Party Rus'
|
|0.18%
|-
|style="background-color:#000000"|
|colspan=2 |against all
|
|14.53%
|-
| colspan="5" style="background-color:#E9E9E9;"|
|- style="font-weight:bold"
| colspan="3" style="text-align:left;" | Total
| 
| 100%
|-
| colspan="5" style="background-color:#E9E9E9;"|
|- style="font-weight:bold"
| colspan="4" |Source:
|
|}

2005

|-
! colspan=2 style="background-color:#E9E9E9;text-align:left;vertical-align:top;" |Candidate
! style="background-color:#E9E9E9;text-align:left;vertical-align:top;" |Party
! style="background-color:#E9E9E9;text-align:right;" |Votes
! style="background-color:#E9E9E9;text-align:right;" |%
|-
|style="background-color:"|
|align=left|Dmitry Yeryomin
|align=left|United Russia
|
|39.23%
|-
|style="background-color:#1042A5"|
|align=left|Konstantin Zhabotinsky
|align=left|Union of Right Forces
|
|13.28%
|-
|style="background-color:"|
|align=left|Aleksandr Deyneko
|align=left|Independent
|
|11.64%
|-
|style="background-color:#000000"|
|colspan=2 |against all
|
|29.73%
|-
| colspan="5" style="background-color:#E9E9E9;"|
|- style="font-weight:bold"
| colspan="3" style="text-align:left;" | Total
| 
| 100%
|-
| colspan="5" style="background-color:#E9E9E9;"|
|- style="font-weight:bold"
| colspan="4" |Source:
|
|}

2016

|-
! colspan=2 style="background-color:#E9E9E9;text-align:left;vertical-align:top;" |Candidate
! style="background-color:#E9E9E9;text-align:leftt;vertical-align:top;" |Party
! style="background-color:#E9E9E9;text-align:right;" |Votes
! style="background-color:#E9E9E9;text-align:right;" |%
|-
| style="background-color: " |
|align=left|Andrey Baryshev
|align=left|United Russia
|
|39.37%
|-
| style="background-color: " |
|align=left|Guzelia Voloshina
|align=left|A Just Russia
|
|20.08%
|-
|style="background-color:"|
|align=left|Yekaterina Fedotova
|align=left|Liberal Democratic Party
|
|12.15%
|-
|style="background-color:"|
|align=left|Eldar Gilmutdinov
|align=left|Communist Party
|
|11.46%
|-
|style="background-color: " |
|align=left|Andrey Talevlin
|align=left|Yabloko
|
|4.12%
|-
|style="background-color:"|
|align=left|Aleksey Neuymin
|align=left|The Greens
|
|2.53%
|-
|style="background-color:"|
|align=left|Gamil Asatullin
|align=left|People's Freedom Party
|
|1.99%
|-
|style="background-color:"|
|align=left|Mikhail Razzhivin
|align=left|Patriots of Russia
|
|1.76%
|-
|style="background-color:"|
|align=left|Ramil Mukhametshin
|align=left|Civic Platform
|
|1.02%
|-
|style="background-color:#00A650"|
|align=left|Aleksey Kungurtsev
|align=left|Civilian Power
|
|1.00%
|-
| colspan="5" style="background-color:#E9E9E9;"|
|- style="font-weight:bold"
| colspan="3" style="text-align:left;" | Total
| 
| 100%
|-
| colspan="5" style="background-color:#E9E9E9;"|
|- style="font-weight:bold"
| colspan="4" |Source:
|
|}

2021

|-
! colspan=2 style="background-color:#E9E9E9;text-align:left;vertical-align:top;" |Candidate
! style="background-color:#E9E9E9;text-align:left;vertical-align:top;" |Party
! style="background-color:#E9E9E9;text-align:right;" |Votes
! style="background-color:#E9E9E9;text-align:right;" |%
|-
|style="background-color: " |
|align=left|Vladimir Pavlov
|align=left|United Russia
|
|31.60%
|-
|style="background-color:"|
|align=left|Vasily Shvetsov
|align=left|A Just Russia — For Truth
|
|16.78%
|-
|style="background-color:"|
|align=left|Aleksandr Andreyev
|align=left|Communist Party
|
|13.17%
|-
|style="background-color: "|
|align=left|Vladimir Vladimirsky
|align=left|Party of Pensioners
|
|9.00%
|-
|style="background-color:"|
|align=left|Maksim Gulin
|align=left|New People
|
|7.35%
|-
|style="background-color: " |
|align=left|Yelena Vakhtina
|align=left|Communists of Russia
|
|6.90%
|-
|style="background-color:"|
|align=left|Yevgeny Reva
|align=left|Liberal Democratic Party
|
|4.64%
|-
|style="background-color:"|
|align=left|Sergey Smyshlyayev
|align=left|Rodina
|
|2.25%
|-
|style="background-color: "|
|align=left|Andrey Yatsun
|align=left|Russian Party of Freedom and Justice
|
|2.16%
|-
|style="background-color: " |
|align=left|Yaroslav Shcherbakov
|align=left|Yabloko
|
|1.93%
|-
| colspan="5" style="background-color:#E9E9E9;"|
|- style="font-weight:bold"
| colspan="3" style="text-align:left;" | Total
| 
| 100%
|-
| colspan="5" style="background-color:#E9E9E9;"|
|- style="font-weight:bold"
| colspan="4" |Source:
|
|}

Notes

References

Russian legislative constituencies
Politics of Chelyabinsk Oblast